Acmaeodera purshiae, the bitterbrush jewel beetle, is a species of metallic wood-boring beetle in the family Buprestidae. It is found in North America.

References

Further reading

 
 
 

purshiae
Articles created by Qbugbot
Beetles described in 1926